was an admiral in the Imperial Japanese Navy during World War II.

Biography 
Akiyama was a native of Kumamoto prefecture. He graduated from the 41st class of the Imperial Japanese Naval Academy in 1913, ranked 61st out of 118 cadets. After he was commissioned as an ensign, he was assigned to the battleship . He subsequently served on the battleship , cruiser  and destroyer Yudachi.

Akiyama was promoted to lieutenant on 1 December 1918, and was assigned to the destroyer  as chief torpedo officer. However, from 1921–1922, he also served as executive officer on the submarines SS-35 and SS-45.

On 7 February 1924, he was given his first command: the destroyer . Promoted to captain on 1 December 1937, he served in mostly staff assignments until the start of the Pacific War, with the exception of a posting as captain of the cruiser  in 1939. He was promoted to rear admiral on 1 November 1942.

During the Solomon Islands campaign, on 6 July 1943, Akiyama commanded the 3rd Destroyer Squadron, which consisted of 10 destroyers loaded with 2,600 combat troops, bound for Vila on Kolombangara. In the resultant Battle of Kula Gulf, the American ships opened fire at 01:57 and quickly sank the Japanese flagship, destroyer , killing Admiral Akiyama.

Akiyama was posthumously promoted to vice admiral.

Notable positions held 
 Commanding Officer, MS W-1 - 1 December 1925 – 1 December 1926
 Commanding Officer, MS W-1 - 20 January 1928 – 1 November 1928
 Commanding Officer, DD Murakumo - 1 December 1932 – 15 November 1935
 Commanding Officer, DD Usugumo - 1 November 1934 – 15 November 1934
 ComDesDiv 30 – 1 December 1937 – 10 December 1938
 ComDesDiv 4 – 10 December 1938 – 25 October 1939
 ComDesDiv 34 – 25 October 1939 – 15 November 1939
 Commanding Officer, CL Naka - 15 November 1939 – 15 October 1940
 ComDesRon 3 – 23 March 1943 – 6 July 1943 (KIA)

Dates of promotions 
 Midshipman - 19 December 1913
 Ensign - 1 December 1914
 Lieutenant (j.g.) - 1 December 1916
 Lieutenant - 1 December 1920
 Lieutenant Commander - 1 December 1926
 Commander - 1 December 1932
 Captain - 1 December 1937
 Rear Admiral - 1 November 1942
 Vice Admiral - 6 July 1943 (posthumous)

Notes

References

Books

External links 

1891 births
1943 deaths
People from Kumamoto Prefecture
Japanese admirals of World War II
Imperial Japanese Navy admirals
Japanese military personnel killed in World War II